Scouting in Alaska has a long history, from the 1920s to the present day, serving thousands of youth in programs that suit the environment in which they live. Alaska shares a communal Scout history, only being broken into smaller councils in the 1960s.

Early history (1920s-1950)
Scouting came to Alaska in the 1920s, and the Alaska Territorial Council was created in the 1930s.

Recent history (1950–1990)

Boy Scouting in Alaska today
There are two Boy Scouts of America local councils in Alaska.

Great Alaska Council

The Western Alaska Council and Southeast Alaska Council merged to form the Great Alaska Council in January, 2006.  The combined Supercouncil has 3,000 volunteers serving 16,000 youth. The Western Alaska Council was formed in 1954 from a part of the Seattle Council, which had absorbed the  Alaska Council in 1954.

Scouts in the Russian oblast of Magadan have a relationship with the Great Alaska Council.

Organization
Bear Paw District (serves the Matanuska-Susitna Borough and Valdez)
Denali District (serves Southern Anchorage and Girdwood)
Eklutna District (serves Northern Anchorage, Chugiak and Eagle River)
Maritime District (formerly of Southeast Alaska Council, serves Juneau, Haines, Sitka and Skagway)
Totem District (formerly of Southeast Alaska Council, serves Petersburg, Wrangell, Ketchikan, Prince of Wales Island, and environs)
Tustumena District (serves Kenai Peninsula, Cordova, Kodiak, and Western Alaska)

Order of the Arow
Nanuk Lodge #355 absorbed Kootz Lodge #523 when Western Alaska Council merged with Southeast Alaska Council.

Nanuk Lodge was created in 1947, and is celebrating its 60th anniversary in 2007.

Midnight Sun Council

The Midnight Sun Council serves interior and northern Alaska, and is headquartered in Fairbanks.

Organization
Tanana Valley District
Bush District

Camps
Lost Lake Scout Camp
Northern Lights High Adventure

Order of the Arrow
Toontuk Lodge #549 was founded in 1961.  The lodge is named after the barren ground caribou, which is known to the Yupik Eskimo people of Western Alaska as Toontuk.  Toontuk Lodge was recognized with the National Service Grant in 1997.  The money was used to rehabilitate the waterfront at Lost Lake Scout Camp with sand and a lifeguard tower.  In 2006, Toontuk Lodge celebrated its 45th anniversary.  Among its projects that year, the Lodge gave the Council a large amphitheater sited on Lost Lake at Lost Lake Camp.

Girl Scouting in Alaska  

As of October 2009 two Girl Scout councils exist in Alaska.

Farthest North Girl Scout Council

This council was started in 1925 by a handful of girls in Fairbanks, Alaska headed by Jessie Bloom. Girl Scouting expanded to rural Alaska in 1945 with the establishment of the first troop in Nome.  Since English was not the predominantly spoken language, they learned the Girl Scout Promise in Yup'ik and English.

Girl Scouts of Alaska

Girl Scouts of Alaska was formed on October 1, 2009 by the merger of Girl Scouts Susitna Council and Tongass Alaska Girl Scout Council and serves all of Alaska, south of the 63 parallel. Girl Scouts of Alaska is the proven leadership development program for girls in grades K-12. Girl Scouts provides a safe, inclusive environment for Alaska’s diverse population of girls, regardless of income or socioeconomic background. With the help of adult volunteers, Girl Scouts of Alaska (GSAK) serves girls from Bethel to Ketchikan. GSAK is headquartered in Anchorage, with a field office in Juneau.

Camps
Camp Togowoods in Wasilla and Camp Singing Hills in Peters Creek.

See also
Scouting in British Columbia
Scouting in Yukon

References

External links

Section W-1N, Order of the Arrow

Youth organizations based in Alaska
Alaska
Western Region (Boy Scouts of America)